Jean Vuillemin is a French computer scientist known for his work in data structures and parallel computing. He is a professor of computer science at the École normale supérieure (Paris).

Contributions
Vuillemin invented the binomial heap and Cartesian tree data structures. With Ron Rivest, he proved the  Aanderaa–Rosenberg conjecture, according to which any deterministic algorithm that tests a nontrivial monotone property of graphs, using queries that test whether pairs of vertices are adjacent, must perform a quadratic number of adjacency queries.

In the 1980s, Vuillemin was the director of a project to develop a workstation using VLSI technology, under which the Le Lisp programming language was developed. With Franco P. Preparata, he also introduced the cube-connected cycles as a network topology in parallel computing.

Education and career
Vuillemin earned an engineering degree at the École Polytechnique in 1968, a doctorate (troisième cycle) at the University of Paris in 1969, a Ph.D. from Stanford University in 1972 under the supervision of Zohar Manna, and a state doctorate from Paris Diderot University in 1974.

He became an assistant professor at the University of California, Berkeley in 1974, but then returned to France in 1975 for a position at the University of Paris-Sud. He moved to the École Polytechnique in 1982, to the Ecole de Management Léonard De Vinci in 1994, and to the École normale supérieure in 1997.

Selected publications

References

External links
Home page

Year of birth missing (living people)
Living people
French computer scientists
Stanford University alumni
University of California, Berkeley faculty